Hemimastigophora is a group of single-celled eukaryotic organisms with a single family, Spironemidae, first identified in 1988. Over the next 30 years, different authors proposed placing these organisms in various branches of the eukaryotes. In 2018 Lax et al. reported the first genetic information for Spironemidae, and suggest that they are from an ancient lineage of eukaryotes which constitute a separate clade from all other eukaryotic kingdoms. It is potentially related to the Telonemia.

History of classification

Hemimastigophora was established in 1988 by Foissner et al., as a new phylum with a single family, Spironemidae. Its placement on the eukaryote tree of life was unclear, but the authors suggested that the structure of its pellicle and cell nucleus indicated a close relationship with Euglenozoa. For 30 years after the description of the group, no genetic information was available. During that time, researchers proposed that it should be classified in, or near, an assortment of other groups, including the alveolates, apusomonads, ancyromonads, and Rhizaria.

In an article published in 2018, Lax et al. announced that a new hemimastigophoran species, Hemimastix kukwesjijk, had been discovered in a Nova Scotian soil sample, and successfully cultivated in the laboratory. A second hemimastigophoran, a new species of Spironema, was found in the same sample. Phylogenomic analyses of the two organisms suggest that Hemimastigophora is a very ancient lineage, which diverged from the other eukaryotes at such an early date that the group should be classified at the supra-kingdom level.

References 
 

 
Eukaryotes